Heteromyia is a genus of biting midges in the family Ceratopogonidae. There are about 17 described species in Heteromyia.

Species
These 17 species belong to the genus Heteromyia:

 Heteromyia antequerae (Lynch Arribalzaga, 1893)
 Heteromyia bejaranoi Duret & Lane, 1955
 Heteromyia castaenea Lane, 1946
 Heteromyia chaquensis Duret & Lane, 1955
 Heteromyia clavata Williston, 1900
 Heteromyia correntina Duret & Lane, 1955
 Heteromyia dominicana Szadziewski & Grogan, 1997
 Heteromyia fasciata Say, 1825
 Heteromyia kiefferi Lane, 1946
 Heteromyia lamprogaster Edwards, 1933
 Heteromyia nigra Kieffer, 1917
 Heteromyia oedidactyla (Ingram & Macfie, 1931)
 Heteromyia orellana (Roback, 1957)
 Heteromyia prattii (Coquillett, 1902)
 Heteromyia rufa Kieffer, 1917
 Heteromyia turgidipes (Ingram & Macfie, 1931)
 Heteromyia wokei Wirth & Grogan

References

Further reading

External links

 

Ceratopogonidae
Chironomoidea genera
Taxa named by Thomas Say
Articles created by Qbugbot